The San Carlos River is a river located in the Alto Paraguay Department of Paraguay.

References

Rivers of Paraguay
Geography of Alto Paraguay Department